Johan de Witt Jr., heer van Zuid- en Noord-Linschoten, Snelrewaard, Hekendorp and IJsselveere (27 May 1662 at The Hague – 24 January 1701 at Dordrecht) was a Dutch politician, scholar, and collector.

Biography 
Johan Jr. was the son of Johan de Witt and his wife Wendela Bicker (1635–1668). Having been part of the old Dutch patrician De Witt family, De Witt took a seat as secretary of the city of Dordrecht.

In 1672, after the murder of his father, his uncle Pieter de Graeff became the guardian of Johann and his siblings.
Johan de Witt Jr. later became the overseer of the orphanage in Dordrecht (1684–1685). After that he became secretary (1688–1701) and member of the College of Forty (1695) of Dordrecht.

Johan de Witt married his cousin Wilhelmina de Witt (1671–1701), the daughter of his uncle Cornelis de Witt (1623–1672) en Maria van Berckel (1632–1706). The couple had two children:
 Johan (1694–1751), who inherited his father's property and sold them in 1723 to Jan Hendrik Strick van Linschoten.
 Cornelis de Witt (1696–1769), Burgomaster of Dordrecht and vrijheer of Jaarsveld.

Johan de Witt owned an extensive library, consisting of books that previously belonged to his father as well as additions of his own.

References

1662 births
1701 deaths
People from Dordrecht
De Witt family

de:Johan II. de Witt
fy:Johan de Witt Jr.
nl:Johan de Witt (1662-1701)